Apodemia zela, the zela metalmark, is a species of metalmark in the butterfly family Riodinidae. It is found in North America.

Subspecies
These four subspecies belong to the species Apodemia zela:
 Apodemia zela ares Edwards, 1882
 Apodemia zela aureola Stichel, 1926
 Apodemia zela cleis (W. H. Edwards, 1882)
 Apodemia zela zela

References

Further reading

External links

 

Riodininae
Articles created by Qbugbot
Butterflies described in 1870